Michele Reale (born 14 June 1971) is an Italian professional golfer.

Reale was born in Biella, Piedmont. Having won the Italian Under 20 Championship as an amateur in 1991, he turned professional the following year.

Reale played in three tournaments on the second tier European Challenge Tour in 1992, before making his first attempt at qualifying for the top level European Tour. He got through to the final stage of qualifying school, but had to settle for a place on the second tier for 1993. He failed to graduate through qualifying school in each of the next four years, but his performances on the Challenge Tour steadily improved, culminating in 1997 when he won twice on his way to the top of the rankings, and a place on the European Tour for 1998.

Unfortunately, during his rookie season on the European Tour, Reale contracted measles, and wound up back at qualifying school at the end of the year. This time he was successful, but in 1999 again enjoyed a fruitless season at the highest level, and returned to the Challenge Tour for 2000. He finished that season in 5th place on the rankings, to gain promotion back to the European Tour. He has since spent most of his career on the Challenge Tour, visiting qualifying school every year, with success in 2001 and 2005, but has failed to improve on his début showing of 120th on the European Tour Order of Merit.

Professional wins (5)

Challenge Tour wins (2)

Other wins (3)
1991 Italian Under 20 Championship (as an amateur)
1992 Italian PGA Championship
1994 Italian Under 25 Championship

Team appearances
Amateur
European Youths' Team Championship (representing Italy): 1990 (winners)

See also
2005 European Tour Qualifying School graduates

References

External links

Italian male golfers
European Tour golfers
People from Biella
1971 births
Living people